Sandra Lim is a Korean American poet and professor.

Career
She is the author of three poetry collections -- The Curious Thing (W.W. Norton, 2021), The Wilderness (W.W. Norton, 2014), and Loveliest Grotesque (Kore Press, 2006). The Wilderness was the winner of the 2013 Barnard Women Poets Prize and the Levis Reading Prize. Her poems have appeared in numerous literary journals and magazines, including The New York Review of Books, Poetry Magazine, The Yale Review, Boston Review, The New Republic, and Gulf Coast. Her poems and essays have been anthologized in Atlantic Currents (Loom Press, 2020), Counterclaims (Dalkey Archive Press, 2020), The Poem’s Country (Pleiades Press, 2018), and The Echoing Green (Modern Library, 2016), among others. She serves on the editorial board of Poetry Daily.

Lim's honors include fellowships from MacDowell, the Vermont Studio Center, and the Getty Foundation. She is a two-time Pushcart Prize winner and the recipient of a 2020 Award in Literature from the American Academy of Arts and Letters. In 2021, Lim was awarded a Guggenheim Fellowship for her poetry.

Born in Seoul, Korea, Lim grew up in the San Francisco Bay Area. She received her MFA from the Iowa Writers’ Workshop, a BA from Stanford University, and her PhD in English from University of California, Berkeley. She is an associate professor of English at University of Massachusetts Lowell in Lowell, Massachusetts. She has taught for The Frost Place, Kundiman, and for the low-residency MFA program at Warren Wilson College.

Awards
2021: Guggenheim Fellowship in Poetry
2020: American Academy of Arts and Letters
2015: Levis Reading Prize
2015 and 2022: Pushcart Prize
2013: Barnard Women Poets Prize

Published works
Poetry Books
The Curious Thing, W.W. Norton, 2021
The Wilderness, W.W. Norton, 2014
Loveliest Grotesque, Kore Press, 2006

Selected Anthologies
Atlantic Currents: Cork and Lowell Writers. Eds. Paul Marion and John Wooding. Lowell: Loom Press, 2020.
There are Girls Like Lions: Poems about Being a Woman. Forward by Cole Swenson. San Francisco: Chronicle Books, 2019. 
The Poem’s Country. Eds. Shara Lessley and Bruce Snider. Warrensburg, Missouri: Pleiades Press, 2018.
The Echoing Green: Poems of Fields, Meadows, and Grasses. Ed. Cecily Parks. New York: Modern Library, 2016.
Gurlesque: The New Grrly, Grotesque, Burlesque Poetics. Eds. Lara Glenum and Arielle Greenberg. Ardmore, PA: Saturnalia Books, 2010.

References

External links
Official website
Sandra Lim, poems and bio, Poetry Foundation
Sandra Lim at Poets.org

American women poets
21st-century American poets
University of Massachusetts Lowell faculty
People from Seoul
South Korean emigrants to the United States
Living people
21st-century American women writers
Year of birth missing (living people)
American women academics